Andrew Mackenzie Hull (August 15, 1963 – May 8, 2010) was a Canadian-born film maker, film director and architect. He was born in Oshawa, Ontario, Canada, and died in London, England.

Early life
Andrew Hull was the youngest of three children born to Ralph Hull, psychiatrist, and Margot Finley, artist. He spent his childhood in Ann Arbor, Michigan and Peterborough, Ontario, attended Lakefield College School as a boy, and studied architecture at Carleton University, Ottawa.  During his studies in 1989 he won the AIA/ACSA Research Council-Otis Elevator International Student Competition for his mixed-use commercial, retail and residential design for a development in historic London.  Despite this accolade his interests shifted to film and video.  Being one of the first students to work with video at the School of Architecture, he graduated with an experimental video work about a cryptic symbol of a traced hand that appears in the urban environment.  This first completed video marked his move from architecture into narrative film.

Film career
While working as an architect in Paris in 1991, Andrew Hull was invited to Germany by Carleton University colleagues Stephen Kovats and Ian Johnston to work on video and animation projects and to mentor students of the Bauhaus Dessau's international and multi-disciplinary 'Experimental Studio Dessau North'.  In 1992 he was co-commissioned by the 'Werkstatt Industrielles Gartenreich' of the Bauhaus Dessau Foundation to make a documentary video about the 'Kulturpalast Bitterfeld', a Socialist Utopian model project of the German Democratic Republic, built in 1954.  His collaborator in this video project was Stephen Kovats, media researcher, architect and artistic director of Transmediale. The film was entitled "Pay No Attention to the Man Behind the Curtain". As a result of this collaboration, Hull moved to Germany, living first in Dessau, later in Berlin. He made films during this period and taught at the Bauhaus Dessau in the newly created Electronic Media Interpretation Studio. Hull's films from this time explored the genres of horror and comedy, the real and the fictional; they also documented and questioned the strained political and social transformations taking place in Germany after the fall of the Berlin Wall. In Dessau he made Earworm, a forty-three-minute film funded by both German and Canadian Arts Councils that told the story of a group of anarchist karaoke enthusiasts gripped by a mysterious virus that causes an addiction to techno music and a taste for sucking the inner ear out of unsuspecting victims.  The film could be read as a metaphor and biting satire on the paranoia of communist era East Germany, intertwined with the politics around HIV/AIDS, and the growing gay underground club and rave scene in Germany in the late eighties and early nineties.  Hull also presented the video installation Berlin Alexanderplatz at the Ostranenie International Video Festival at the Bauhaus Dessau.

In 1996 Andrew Hull returned to Canada and lived in Toronto until 2008. While working as an Art Director in the Canadian/US Film and Television industry, he wrote and directed several of his own short films. Dizzy (Winner of Best Short at the Long Island Gay and Lesbian Film Festival in 2003) and That Thing We Do (Winner of Best Short at the Tampa International Gay and Lesbian Film Festival in 2004) were made with assistance from the Canada Council for the Arts and the Ontario Arts Council and were coming-of-age stories directly based on his own experiences and diaristic writings. In 2003, Hull was one of eight students invited to enter the  Director's Program at the Norman Jewison created Canadian Film Centre (CFC), Canada's foremost school for advanced training in film, television and new media.  He graduated in 2004 with the short film Squeezebox, a tragicomedy starring Canadian cult rock heroine, actress and singer-songwriter Mary Margaret O'Hara. The film is the story of a teen accordion prodigy who struggles to reunite the family band after his father's suicide. Rewind, a five-minute film made shortly after Hull's graduation from the Canadian Film Centre, paid homage to film noir and was loosely based on Martin Amis' book Time's Arrow. All of Hull's films from this period went on to tour at film festivals around the globe.

In 2008 Andrew re-located to London, England, to be with his life partner, contemporary artist and painter, Shaan Syed, and to begin production on his first feature film, Siren, co-written with Canadian-born, US-based screenwriter Geoffrey Gunn. Siren, a horror / thriller genre film is an allegory on the Greek myth of the siren, and tells the tale of three friends whose lives are forever changed when they stop to rescue a beautiful young woman on a remote island.  The film was produced by UK-based Poisson Rouge Pictures and was shot in Tunisia during the summer of 2009. The film's soundtrack features and is based on the Los Angeles all-girl group Warpaint's song, "Elephants". It premiered on November 11, 2010, at Abertoir Film Festival in Wales, UK to critical acclaim  and was subsequently bought by Lionsgate to be released to DVD in March 2011.

Death
Andrew Hull died at the Royal London Hospital on May 8, 2010, of a head injury as a result of a fall from his bicycle. Hull was at the time close to finishing a final edit on his newest short film Breaking and Entering, shot in Toronto in 2008. The film is a story of a young man coming to terms with the death of his father, and is based on the short story of the same name by Canadian author Andrew Pyper.  The film was subsequently completed by the Estate of Andrew Hull.

Representation
Andrew Hull was a member of the Directors Guild of Canada. His short films are distributed by the Canadian Film Maker's Distribution Centre (CFMDC) and V tape, both in Toronto. Siren is distributed by Lionsgate.

Posthumous artist tributes and works

London-based choreographer and artistic director of Dance Art Foundation, Joe Moran dedicated his piece Score for 30 Dancers to Andrew Hull. It was presented on May 27, 2010, as part of From Morning, a day of dance and performance curated by London-based dancer and choreographer, Florence Peak. The piece was performed by thirty of the UK's most prominent dance artists and was made in response to an invitation to create a new site-specific work that spoke to the distinct architecture of Nicholas Hawksmoor's Christ Church, Spitalfields in the East End of London, the neighbourhood where Hull lived and died from 2008 to 2010.

London-based Dutch contemporary artist, Magali Reus, in the final credit of her 2010 video work Finish, dedicated the piece to Andrew Mackenzie Hull. The short work was premiered at Galerie Fons Welters in Amsterdam in July 2010 as part of a solo exhibition of sculpture and video titled Weekend and featured five athletes/actors racing against the backdrop of an ocean beach. Reus had previously featured Hull in her video Conflicting Shadows (2009) as the main actor playing an ambiguous street patroller at night.

In November 2010, Andrew Hull's life partner, artist Shaan Syed, began The Andrew Project, a street-poster campaign featuring one thousand identical line drawings of Andrew's portrait posted throughout Toronto, the city in which the couple first met in 2001.

Filmography

References

1963 births
2010 deaths
Artists from Oshawa
Film directors from Ontario
Writers from Ontario
Canadian LGBT artists
Canadian male screenwriters
LGBT film directors
Canadian LGBT screenwriters
Canadian gay writers
Cycling road incident deaths
Road incident deaths in London
Deaths from falls
21st-century Canadian LGBT people
20th-century Canadian screenwriters
20th-century Canadian male writers
21st-century Canadian screenwriters
21st-century Canadian male writers
Gay screenwriters